Tadeusz Franciszek Derko (born 22 December 1946) is a former Italian professional footballer who played in the Football League for Mansfield Town.

References

1946 births
living people
Italian footballers
Association football forwards
English Football League players
Mansfield Town F.C. players